Mount Babel may refer to summits in Canada:

In Canada